Valentin Vasilyevich Bobyrev (born November 27, 1947) is a member of the State Duma of Russia for the United Russia party. He is a jurist, and sits on the State Duma's Committee on National Security. He used to be a deputy head of the Novosibirsk Oblast government.

References

External links
  Valentin Bobyrev official website

1947 births
Living people
United Russia politicians
21st-century Russian politicians
Russian jurists
Liberal Democratic Party of Russia politicians
Fourth convocation members of the State Duma (Russian Federation)
Fifth convocation members of the State Duma (Russian Federation)
Kutafin Moscow State Law University alumni